Kirriereoch Hill is a hill in the Range of the Awful Hand, a sub-range of the Galloway Hills range, part of the Southern Uplands of Scotland. It lies on the border of the old counties of Ayrshire and Kirkcudbrightshire, or the modern regions of Dumfries and Galloway and South Ayrshire. A boundary wall near the summit is the highest point in South Ayrshire and Ayrshire as a whole. Kirriereoch Hill was classified as a Corbett and Marilyn but then deleted from these lists in 1984 due to not being thought to achieve the respective prominence criteria. In August 2015 the hill was relisted as a Marilyn after having been surveyed to have a 150.2 m prominence. However, since this is less than the 152.4 m required, the hill will not be re-listed as a Corbett.

References

External links
 Information on Hill Walking in the Galloway Hills
 Photo Tour of hiking Kirriereoch and Tarfessock from Kirriereoch Car Park

Marilyns of Scotland
Donald mountains
Mountains and hills of Dumfries and Galloway
Highest points of historic Scottish counties